Carlos Brown (born April 28, 1988) is a former American football running back. He was signed by the New Orleans Saints as an undrafted free agent in 2010. He played college football at Michigan.

He has also been an off-season or practice squad member of the Tampa Bay Buccaneers and New York Jets.

Early years
Brown was a highly recruited running back coming out of Heard County High School.  During his high school career, Brown recorded 4,232 rushing yards on 469 carries, with 52 touchdowns.  Brown also played defense (cornerback and free safety) in high school, and made 203 tackles, forced 11 fumbles, and intercepted 11 passes.  High school awards include all-league and all-conference in his junior and senior years, and Parade Magazine named Brown an All-American.  Brown was ranked as the 5th-best running back in the nation by Rivals.com, 10th-best by ESPN, and 24th-best by Scout.com. Rivals ranked his as the 39th best prospect in the nation and 2nd-best in the state of Georgia, while ESPN ranked him at number 59 in the nation.

College career

Freshman year
Brown played in 7 games as a freshman in 2006 and earned his first varsity letter.  In limited action, Brown carried 16 times for 41 yards.

Sophomore year
Brown earned his second varsity letter as a sophomore in 2007, starting 3 games at tailback and appearing in 8 total games.  He was the Wolverines' third-leading rusher that year, rushing for 382 yards and 4 touchdowns.  He scored his first career touchdown against Purdue on October 13.  A week later he recorded his first career 100-yard rushing game in his first career start against Illinois on October 20.

Junior year
Injuries plagued Carlos Brown's junior season.  He earned his third varsity letter in 2008, but only played in 5 games.  His only 100-yard effort came against Northwestern on November 15, carrying 23 times for 115 yards.  He made his first and only start of the season in a loss to Ohio State, the final game of the worst season in Michigan football history.

Senior year

On September 19, Brown set a career-high with 187 rushing yards against Eastern Michigan, including a 90-yard touchdown run.  The 90-yard touchdown run was the third-longest play in Michigan history, and his efforts against Eastern Michigan earned Brown Big Ten Conference co-offensive player of the week honors along with Northwestern's Mike Kafka.

Professional career

New Orleans Saints
Brown signed as an undrafted free agent with the New Orleans Saints on April 24, 2010, after going undrafted in the 2010 NFL Draft.
Brown was waived by the New Orleans Saints on May 24, 2010.

Tampa Bay Buccaneers
He was signed by the Tampa Bay Buccaneers on August 11, 2010 who released him on September 4.

New York Jets
The New York Jets signed Brown to a future contract on January 5, 2011. He was waived on August 2.

References

External links
Official bio at Michigan
Carlos Brown @ ESPN.com
Carlos Brown at CBS Sports
Carlos Brown at NCAA

1988 births
Living people
Players of American football from Georgia (U.S. state)
American football running backs
Michigan Wolverines football players
New Orleans Saints players
Tampa Bay Buccaneers players
New York Jets players